In mathematics, a bitopological space is a set endowed with two topologies. The notion was introduced by J. C. Kelly in the study of quasimetrics, i.e. distance functions that are not required to be symmetric.

Continuity

Bitopological variants of topological properties
Corresponding to well-known properties of topological spaces, there are versions for bitopological spaces.
 A bitopological space  is called binormal if for every  -closed and  -closed sets there are  -open and  -open sets such that  , and

Notes

References
 Kelly, J. C. (1963). Bitopological spaces. Proc. London Math. Soc., 13(3) 71–89.
 Reilly, I. L. (1972). On bitopological separation properties. Nanta Math., (2) 14–25.
 Reilly, I. L. (1973). Zero dimensional bitopological spaces. Indag. Math., (35) 127–131.
 Salbany, S. (1974). Bitopological spaces, compactifications and completions. Department of Mathematics, University of Cape Town, Cape Town.
 Kopperman, R. (1995). Asymmetry and duality in topology. Topology Appl., 66(1) 1--39.
 Fletcher. P, Hoyle H.B. III, and Patty C.W. (1969). The comparison of topologies.  Duke Math. J.,36(2) 325–331.
 Dochviri, I., Noiri T. (2015). On some properties of stable bitopological spaces. Topol. Proc., 45 111–119.

Topology